For hoses and piping, a quick connect fitting, also called a push fitting, is a coupling used to provide a fast, make-or-break connection of gas or liquid transfer lines. Operated by hand, quick connect fittings replace threaded or flanged connections, require wrenches. When equipped with self-sealing valves, quick connect fittings will, upon disconnection, automatically contain any fluid in the line.

Uses
There is a large variety of quick connect fittings. They are used many kilometers underwater, in drilling operations, in outer space to dock spacecraft, pneumatic-power, plumbing, heating, electrical, and fire-suppression applications. Quick connect fittings are intended to be applied more easily than traditional fittings, requiring only that that pipes be pushed together firmly to lock the teeth of the fitting firmly. The teeth are forced deeper into the tubing when opposing force is applied to them, preventing their separation from the tubing. An o-ring provides a water-tight and airtight seal.

Types
Fittings come in a variety of generic and proprietary types, with market dominance highly dependent on global region.

North America:

 Industrial-type interconnect/interchange, based on military specification MIL-C-4109F
 ARO-type interconnect/interchange, developed by ARO (now part of Ingersoll-Rand), mainly for fluid applications.
 Automotive-type interconnect/interchange, based on a standard set forth by TruFlate for automotive shops, including inflation and pneumatic tools.

Europe:

 European standard, also known as the Highflow European standard
 British standard

Japan:

 Nitto standard

Cost
Unit cost varies from a few dollars for mass-produced compressed air couplings to 1 million dollars for large bore couplings used in the ship-to-shore transfer of liquified natural gas.

See also
 Air-line fitting
 Hose coupling
 Fitting

References

Plumbing
Seals (mechanical)
Hoses